Shoplifting from American Apparel is Tao Lin's first novella, fifth book, and first published fiction since the May 15, 2007 simultaneous publication of his debut novel, Eeeee Eee Eeee, and debut story-collection, Bed.

Shoplifting is based on a short story first published in Vice Magazine's second annual fiction issue. The book is a largely autobiographical slice-of-life about a young aspiring author and occasional shoplifter named Sam.

Shoplifting was published September 15, 2009 by Melville House Publishing and has received mixed reviews. A film adaptation was released in select theaters on December 7, 2012 through Ilikenirvana Productions]. Foreign editions include a Norwegian edition (Cappelen Damm) translated by Audun Mortensen, and forthcoming Spanish (Alpha Decay) and French (Au Diable Vauvert) editions.

References

External links
Review in The Guardian
Review in San Francisco Chronicle
Review in Los Angeles Times
Shoplifting from American Apparel: The Movie nthWORD Magazine Shorts
Review in ireadoddbooks.com

2009 American novels
American novellas
Melville House Publishing books
Works by Tao Lin